One Mad Kiss is a 1930 American musical film directed by Marcel Silver and James Tinling and starring José Mojica, Mona Maris and Antonio Moreno. The film was not a commercial success and lost $263,000 on its release. A separate Spanish-language version El precio de un beso was also released.

It is now considered to be a lost film.

Cast
 José Mojica as José Salvedra  
 Mona Maris as Rosario  
 Antonio Moreno as Don Estrada  
 Tom Patricola as Paco

References

Bibliography
 Jarvinen, Lisa. The Rise of Spanish-language Filmmaking: Out from Hollywood's Shadow, 1929-1939. Rutger's University Press, 2012.
 Solomon, Aubrey. The Fox Film Corporation, 1915-1935: A History and Filmography. McFarland, 2011.

External links
 

1930 films
1930 musical films
American musical films
Fox Film films
Films directed by James Tinling
Lost American films
American black-and-white films
1930 lost films
1930s English-language films
1930s American films